The France River is a tributary of Chibougamau Lake, flowing into the Regional County Municipality (RCM) of Eeyou Istchee Baie-James and in the city of Chibougamau, in Jamésie, in the administrative region of Nord-du-Québec, in the province of Quebec, in Canada.

The course of the river flows into the townships of Bignell, McCorkill and Roy.
 
The hydrographic slope of the "France River" is accessible by the junction of a forest road (East-West direction)
serving the north side of Chibougamau Lake; the latter is connected to route 167 which also serves the south side of Waconichi Lake and the Waconichi River. This last road comes from Chibougamau, going north-east to the south-eastern part of Mistassini Lake.

The surface of the "France River" is usually frozen from early November to mid-May, however traffic Ice safety is usually from mid-November to mid-April.

Geography

Toponymy 
The toponym "rivière France" was made official on December 5, 1968, at the Commission de toponymie du Québec, i.e. at the founding of this commission.

References

See also 

Rivers of Nord-du-Québec
Nottaway River drainage basin
Eeyou Istchee James Bay